"The Drop" is a song by Australian rock band Regurgitator. The song was released in October 2004 as the lead single from the band's fifth studio album Mish Mash!, which was recorded in a bubble in Federation Square, Melbourne, as part of Australian music channel, Channel V's Band in a Bubble program, in which the band entered a small glass recording studio while the public could watch the band work, or tune into a 24-hour digital cable television channel. Upon release, "The Drop" was the 10th most added song to radio and has become a top 5 request on Channel V. The song peaked at number 69 on the Australian ARIA Charts.

The song was voted in at number 85 in the Triple J Hottest 100, 2004.

Track listing

Charts

Release history

References

2004 singles
2004 songs
Songs written by Quan Yeomans
Song recordings produced by Magoo (Australian producer)
Regurgitator songs